The 1980 Taça de Portugal Final was the final match of the 1979–80 Taça de Portugal, the 40th season of the Taça de Portugal, the premier Portuguese football cup competition organized by the Portuguese Football Federation (FPF). The match was played on 7 June 1980 at the Estádio Nacional in Oeiras, and opposed two Primeira Liga sides: Benfica and Porto. Benfica defeated Porto 1–0 to claim the Taça de Portugal for a sixteenth time.

In Portugal, the final was televised live on RTP. As a result of Benfica winning the Taça de Portugal, the Águias qualified for the 1980 Supertaça Cândido de Oliveira where they took on 1979–80 Primeira Divisão winners Sporting CP.

Match

Details

References

1980
Taca
S.L. Benfica matches
FC Porto matches